First Love Letter is a 1991 Indian film directed by Shiva and starring Vivek Mushran and Manisha Koirala  with Chunky Pandey making a special guest appearance.

Plot
First Love Letter is a Pahlaj Nihalani film in which Vivek Mushran and Manisha Koirala made their debut in a romance and action scenario showing that love transcends all barriers. Since Subhash Ghai was introducing the stars in Saudagar (1991 film), Pahlaj Nihalani had to wait for the release of his film, which was completed before Saudagar.

The story opens with Radha, wanting more from life than just being a rich heiress to her father Thakur Ajit Singh's, fortunes and wants to relocate from her home to the hilly locales of  Palampur, where her father has a house. This is not liked by her father, but he has to relent due to the intervention of his younger brother Thakur Shrikant Singh, who has been a recluse since the murder of his lady love Kasturi.

In the hilly locales,  Radha is mesmerized one day to the melodies of a flute, which she follows and meets Shyam, who also saves her life when she is about to fall in the deep gorges of the valleys. They meet again and slowly develop a bond of inseparable love, both being drawn to each other's youth and simplicity. Radha does not disclose her true identity, at first and when Shyam learns that she is the daughter of Thakur Ajit Singh, he feels cheated as he considers him to be a tyrant landlord. To top it, Thakur Ajit Singh also dislikes this growing intimacy between a local milk-seller, which is the profession of Shyam and his only daughter. So he fixes the marriage of his daughter to Thakur Ambar Singh.

Meanwhile, Radha is attacked by seasoned killer Bheema, who wants to molest her, but is timely saved by Thakur Ambar Singh, who also now falls in love with her. His mother, Uma Devi, makes him all the more happy when she tells him that Radha was the same girl that she has fixed his marriage with. This alliance when revealed to Radha by her father and mother, is rejected by her, but she is forcibly married to Thakur Ambar Singh. Radha on her part, leaves the marriage ceremony and tells Thakur Ambar Singh that she loved Shyam and had secretly married him.

Thakur Ajit Singh now gets Shyam embroiled in a false police case and gets him imprisoned from where he jail breaks with none other than the killer Bheema. Bheema is hired as a contract killer by Thakur Ajit Singh to kill Shyam. What follows is a bloody encounter with Thakur Ambar Singh, Bheema, Radha and Shyam, where like a true Rajput, Thakur Ambar Singh wants to leave Radha for Shyam, seeing their love, and is horribly wounded in the prospect. The end sees Thakur Ajit Singh realizing his mistake of separating the true lovers and unites them in matrimony.

Cast
 Vivek Mushran as Shyam
 Manisha Koirala as Radha
 Chunky Pandey as Thakur Ambar Singh
 Danny Denzongpa as Thakur Ajit Singh
 Dalip Tahil as Thakur Shrikant Singh
 Gulshan Grover as Bheema
 Reema Lagoo as Shyam's Mother
 Beena Banerjee as Mrs. Ajit Singh
 Sushma Seth as Uma Singh
 Paintal as Sher Singh
 Harish Patel as Bahadur Singh

Soundtrack

External links 
 

1991 films
Films scored by Bappi Lahiri
1990s Hindi-language films